This is a list of persons with the surname Roosevelt.

A
Alice Hathaway Lee Roosevelt (1861–1884), first wife of Theodore Roosevelt
Alice Roosevelt Longworth (1884–1980), socialite, daughter of Theodore Roosevelt
André Roosevelt (1879–1962), filmmaker
Anna Roosevelt (disambiguation)
Archibald Roosevelt (1894–1979), U.S. Army officer
Archibald Bulloch Roosevelt Jr. (1918–1990), CIA officer

B
Bamie Roosevelt (1855–1931), sister of Theodore Roosevelt
Betsey Cushing Roosevelt Whitney (1908–1998), American philanthropist and ex-wife of James Roosevelt
Blanche Roosevelt (1853–1898), American opera singer and author 
Buddy Roosevelt (1898–1973), American silent film actor and stunt performer

C
Clinton Roosevelt (1804–1898), Democratic party politician
Corinne Roosevelt (1861–1933), sister of Theodore Roosevelt
Cornelius Roosevelt (1794–1871), businessman
Cornelius V.S. Roosevelt (1915–1991), CIA officer
Curtis Roosevelt (1930–2014), UN diplomat and writer

E
Edith Roosevelt (1861–1948), second wife of Theodore Roosevelt
Eleanor Butler Roosevelt (1888–1960), wife of Theodore Roosevelt Jr.
Eleanor Roosevelt (1884–1962), First Lady of the United States
Ellen Roosevelt (1868–1954), tennis player
Elliott Roosevelt (1910–1990), U.S. Air Force officer, son of Franklin Roosevelt
Elliott Roosevelt (socialite) (1860–1894), brother of Theodore Roosevelt
Emlen Roosevelt (1857–1930), banker
Ethel Roosevelt Derby (1891–1977), daughter of Theodore Roosevelt
Ethel du Pont Roosevelt (1916–1965), American heiress and wife of Franklin Delano Roosevelt Jr.

F
Franklin D. Roosevelt (1882–1945), U.S. president
Franklin Delano Roosevelt Jr. (1914–1988), Navy officer and politician
Franklin Delano Roosevelt III (born 1938), economist

G
George Emlen Roosevelt (1887–1963), banker
Grace Roosevelt (1867–1945), American tennis player

H
Hall Roosevelt (1891–1941), brother of Eleanor Roosevelt
Henry L. Roosevelt (1879–1936), Assistant Secretary of the U.S. Navy
Hilborne Roosevelt (1849–1886), organ builder

I
Isaac Roosevelt (businessman) (1790–1863), grandfather of Franklin Roosevelt
Isaac Roosevelt (politician) (1726–1794), banker and New York Revolutionary-era legislator

J
 James Roosevelt (disambiguation)
Johannes Roosevelt (bap.1689–1750), New York City merchant
John Aspinwall Roosevelt (1916–1981), businessman
Joseph Willard Roosevelt (1918–2008), pianist and composer
Julian Roosevelt (1924–1986), Olympic yachtsman

K
Kermit Roosevelt (1889–1943), son of Theodore Roosevelt
Kermit Roosevelt Jr. (1916–2000), CIA officer
Kermit Roosevelt III (born 1971), law professor and author, grandson of Kermit Roosevelt Jr.

M
Mark Roosevelt (born 1955), Democratic politician and president of St. John's College in Santa Fe, New Mexico
Martha Bulloch Roosevelt (1835–1884), mother of Theodore Roosevelt

N
Naaman Roosevelt (born 1987), American football wide receiver 
Nicholas Roosevelt (1658–1742), New York City alderman
Nicholas Roosevelt (inventor) (1767–1854), played a role in the development of the steamboat
Nicholas Roosevelt (diplomat) (1893–1982), diplomat, journalist and author

P
Philip Roosevelt (1892–1941), banker and World War I Army captain

Q
Quentin Roosevelt (1897–1918), son of Theodore Roosevelt
Quentin Roosevelt II (1919–1948), son of Theodore Roosevelt Jr.

R
Robert Roosevelt (1829–1906), U.S. Congressman

S
Samuel M. Roosevelt (1858–1920), portrait painter
Sara Roosevelt (1854–1941), mother of Franklin Roosevelt
Sara Wilford (born 1932), psychology professor
Selwa Roosevelt (born 1929), American journalist and wife of Archibald Bulloch Roosevelt Jr.
Susan Roosevelt Weld (born c.1945), First Lady of Massachusetts

T
Tadd Roosevelt (1879–1958), nephew of Franklin Delano Roosevelt
Theodore Roosevelt (disambiguation)
Theodore Roosevelt (1858–1919), U.S. president
Tweed Roosevelt (born 1942), businessman

W
William Donner Roosevelt (1932–2003), banker

See also
 Roosevelt family, U.S. merchant and political family

Roosevelt